Asiya Devi Tharuni is a Nepalese politician. She is a member of Provincial Assembly of Madhesh Province from Nepali Congress. Tharuni is a resident of Parsagadhi, Parsa.

References

Living people
1957 births
21st-century Nepalese women politicians
21st-century Nepalese politicians
Members of the Provincial Assembly of Madhesh Province
Nepali Congress politicians from Madhesh Province